County Route 549 (CR 549) is a county highway in the U.S. state of New Jersey. The highway extends  from Main Street (Route 166) at County Route 527 in Toms River to County Route 547 at Monmouth CR 21 in Howell.  The highway has the distinction of being the only 500-series route left with two separate spur routes.

The highway passes through Ocean and Monmouth counties and is maintained by its respective county, but there are several indications that the highway at one point may have been or was originally planned to be state maintained.  There are a few mileposts left along the southern section of the highway that have a "NJDT" label on the bottom right corner.  Also, the only "at grade" cloverleaf in New Jersey exists on CR 549, and on the bridges there exists a stamp in the concrete that reads "1975".  No other county bridges have their dates stamped into them.

CR 549 mostly travels through Ocean County. The highway makes frequent turns onto separate roads. The route in its northern segment is a two-lane, rural road, but it becomes a four-lane arterial after crossing the Garden State Parkway all the way to Toms River Township.  County Route 549 handles more traffic than any other county route in all of Ocean County; it is a major link between the townships of Toms River and Brick. As the route is plagued by chronic congestion, the county has invested millions of dollars into upgrading this corridor.  The most recent improvement was from Cedar Bridge Avenue (CR 528) to Beaverson Boulevard. It included widening, signal modification, and the extension of Beaverson Boulevard to meet Old Hooper Avenue.  Ongoing improvements are being made between Beaverson Boulevard and Church Road, where widening and reconstruction should help alleviate some congestion in that area.

Route description

CR 549 begins at an intersection with Route 166 and the southern terminus of CR 527 in Toms River, Ocean County, heading east on four-lane undivided Water Street. The road runs through the commercial downtown of Toms River a short distance to the north of the Toms River. The route turns north onto Hooper Avenue, which passes through more of the downtown area before heading into residential areas and narrowing to two lanes. Upon crossing Route 37, CR 549 becomes a six-lane divided highway with jughandles that passes through commercial areas, narrowing to four lanes. The road heads to the west of the Seacourt Pavilion shopping center and intersects CR 571 at an at-grade cloverleaf interchange. Following this, the roadway passes to the west of the Ocean County Mall, widening to six lanes again. The road narrows back to four lanes at the CR 94 intersection as it passes more shopping centers, turning more to the northeast. CR 549 enters wooded areas as it passes an entrance to Ocean County College and comes to an intersection with the northern terminus of the southern CR 549 Spur. Past this intersection, the route makes a turn to the north again and enters more commercial areas, crossing CR 620 before entering Brick Township. Here, CR 549 becomes Brick Boulevard and intersects CR 631 before continuing past more development with three northbound lanes and two southbound lanes. After the CR 66 junction, the road carries two lanes in each direction as it reaches intersections with CR 624 and CR 528, turning more to the northeast. CR 549 comes to an intersection with CR 631, at which point CR 549 splits from Brick Boulevard by heading northwest on Chambers Bridge Road, with CR 631 continuing north on Brick Boulevard. The four-lane undivided road passes shopping centers and crosses Route 70. After this intersection, CR 549 widens into a four-lane divided highway again and passes more businesses, turning into an undivided road again as it comes to a partial interchange with the Garden State Parkway that has access to and from the southbound direction of the parkway.
 

Immediately after this interchange, the road crosses the Metedeconk River (South Branch) into Lakewood Township and turns north, coming to the Route 88 intersection. At this point, CR 549 becomes two-lane undivided Lanes Mill Road and enters forested areas with some homes, turning northeast as it comes to the eastern terminus of CR 526. Immediately after, the route crosses the Metedeconk River (North Branch) back into Brick Township and passes more residential and business areas, heading west of a park and ride lot, before intersecting CR 63. At this intersection, CR 549 turns east onto Burnt Tavern Road and has an interchange with the Garden State Parkway again, this time providing full access. After the parkway, CR 549 turns north onto Lanes Mill Road, with CR 632 continuing east on Burnt Tavern Road. The Brick Park & Ride serving NJ Transit buses to New York City is located along the ramp from CR 549 to the northbound Garden State Parkway. The road passes residential subdivisions and continues northeast onto Sally Ike Road, with CR 12 heading northeast along Lanes Mill Road. The route comes to an intersection with the northern CR 549 Spur, and CR 549 turns northwest onto Herbertsville Road, with CR 14 continuing north on Sally Ike Road. The route crosses into Wall Township, Monmouth County and passes under the Garden State Parkway before entering wooded areas with some homes. The road enters Howell Township and intersects CR 21, running northwest through wooded areas of Allaire State Park. CR 549 comes to its northern terminus at CR 547, with the road continuing northwest as CR 21.

In Monmouth County, CR 549 is signed as east-west.

History
The Fischer Boulevard Extension was proposed in the late 1990s to alleviate severe congestion on Hooper Avenue (County Route 549) from Toms River Township into Brick Township. It would have continued Fischer Boulevard (County Route 549 Spur) north through undeveloped land near Ocean County College, before connecting with Church Road near its intersection with North Bay Avenue near the Garden State Parkway overpass. The extension would have moderated traffic on 549 as traffic from the northern and western parts of Toms River could use the extension to get to the shore area. Since Fischer Blvd ends at its intersection with Hooper Avenue, all traffic has to take Hooper to get to their destination whether it is to Brick or the western sections of Toms River. The plan has been in the works but has been stalled for several years.

Major intersections

CR 549 Spur

Southern section

County Route 549 Spur, abbreviated CR 549 Spur, is a county highway in the U.S. state of New Jersey. The southern segment extends  from Route 37 to Hooper Avenue (CR 549) in Toms River Township. The southern spur runs along Fischer Boulevard and with the recent completion of a widening project, the highway has been fully reconstructed from Bay Avenue (CR 571) to Hooper Avenue (CR 549).  Fischer Boulevard is a major commuting route in Toms River.

Major intersections

Northern section

County Route 549 Spur, abbreviated CR 549 Spur, is a county highway in the U.S. state of New Jersey. The northern segment extends  from Route 88 and Ocean CR 630 in Point Pleasant to Sally Ike Road (CR 549) in Brick Township.  The northern spur runs along Herbertsville Road and is a two-lane road for its entire length, except when it meets Route 70 (a four-lane road with left-turning lanes).

Major intersections

See also

References

External links 

County Route 549 signs and pictures
New Jersey 5xx Routes
CR 549 (Greater New York Roads)

549
549
549